Kubschütz (German) or Kubšicy (Upper Sorbian) is a municipality in the district of Bautzen, in Saxony, Germany.

The municipality is part of the recognized Sorbian settlement area in Saxony. Upper Sorbian has an official status next to German, all villages bear names in both languages.

Villages 
Several villages belong to the municipality (names given in German/Upper Sorbian):

References 

Municipalities in Saxony
Populated places in Bautzen (district)